Thayamma is a 1991 Indian Tamil-language film directed by Gopi Bhimsingh, starring Pandiyan, Anand Babu and Babu with Geetha and Oru Thalai Ragam Shankar. The film also starred Goundamani as well as Senthil. The film was a remake of Malayalam film Thoovalsparsham which was inspired by the 1987 American film Three Men and a Baby, which itself was based on the 1985 French movie Three Men and a Cradle and later on remade in Telugu as Chinnari Muddula Papa , in Tamil again as Asathal and in Hindi as Heyy Babyy (2007) The film was dubbed in Telugu as Bujjipapa Brahmacharulu.

Plot

Three young bachelors Pandiyan, Anand and Babu are friends and roommates in an apartment. Rangarajan is their neighbour who is studying for IAS. One day, Pandiyan warns his friends that a parcel will arrive during his absence. The next day, Anand and Babu find a baby before their door. The three bachelors swear that they are not her father. Since then, their lives are completely changed. First, they try to abandon the baby but then they take care of the baby and name her Thayamma. What transpires later forms the crux of the story.

Cast

Soundtrack

The film score and the soundtrack were composed by Ilaiyaraaja. The soundtrack, released in 1991, features 4 tracks with lyrics written by Gangai Amaran.

References

1991 films
Indian comedy films
Films scored by Ilaiyaraaja
Tamil remakes of Malayalam films
1990s Tamil-language films
Indian remakes of French films
1991 comedy films